The Calabazas shiner (Notropis calabazas) is a species of ray-finned fish in the genus Notropis. It is endemic to central Mexico, where it is found in the Rio Panuco basin.

References 

 

Calabazas
Fish described in 2004